Pope Lucius III created fifteen new cardinals.

Conistories

21 May 1182 
 Pedro de Cardona, archbishop-elect of Toledo – cardinal-priest of S. Lorenzo in Damaso, † 26 June 1182
 Hugo Etherianis – cardinal-deacon of S. Angelo, † August 1182

17 December 1182 
 Bobo – cardinal-deacon of S. Angelo, then (12 March 1188) cardinal-priest of S. Anastasia, finally (May 1189) cardinal-bishop of Porto e S. Rufina, † 1189
 Ottaviano di Paoli – cardinal-deacon of SS. Sergio e Bacco, then (May 1189) cardinal-bishop of Ostia e Velletri, † 5 April 1206
 Gerardo  – cardinal-deacon of S. Adriano, † 1208
 Soffredo  – cardinal-deacon of S. Maria in Via Lata, then (20 February 1193) cardinal-priest of S. Prassede, † 14 December 1210
 Albino, Can.Reg. – cardinal-deacon of S. Maria Nuova, then (15 March 1185) cardinal-priest of S. Croce in Gerusalemme, finally (May 1189) cardinal-bishop of Albano, † 1196
 Pandolfo – cardinal-priest of SS. XII Apostoli, † ca.1210
 Uberto Crivelli – cardinal-priest of S. Lorenzo in Damaso, from 9 January 1185 also archbishop of Milan, became Pope Urban III (25 November 1185) † 20 October 1187

1184 
 Thibaud, O.S.B.Cluny, abbot of Cluny – cardinal-bishop of Ostia e Velletri, † 4 November 1188

15 March 1185 
 Melior, camerlengo of the Holy Roman Church – cardinal-priest of SS. Giovanni e Paolo, † 1197
 Adelardo Cattaneo – cardinal-priest of S. Marcello, then (November 1188) bishop of Verona and cardinalis Sancte Romane Ecclesie, † before October 1214
 Rolando, bishop-elect of Dol – cardinal-deacon of S. Maria in Portico, † shortly before 19 December 1187
 Pietro Diana – cardinal-deacon of S. Nicola in Carcere, then (12 March 1188) cardinal-priest of S. Cecilia, † 1206
 Radulf Nigellus – cardinal-deacon of S. Giorgio in Velabro, dann (12. March 1188) cardinal-priest of S.Prassede, † 30 December 1188

Presumed cardinals 

In older literature are mentioned also the following other cardinals ostensibly created by Lucius III, who, according to modern research should be eliminated from that list because there is no documentary proof of their promotion or they are confused with another cardinals:

Notes

Sources 

 Elfriede Kartusch: Das Kardinalskollegium in der Zeit von 1181-1227. Wien 1948
Werner Maleczek: Papst und Kardinalskolleg von 1191 bis 1216: die Kardinäle unter Coelestin III. und Innocenz III. Wien: Verlag der Österreichischen Akademie der Wissenschaften, 1984
Klaus Ganzer, Die Entwicklung des auswärtigen Kardinalats im hohen Mittelalter, Max Niemeyer Verlag Tübingen 1963
Johannes M. Brixius: Die Mitglieder des Kardinalkollegiums von 1130-1181. Berlin 1912
Regesta Imperii – Liste der Kardinalsunterschriften unter Lucius III.
 Lorenzo Cardella: Memorie storiche de' cardinali della Santa Romana Chiesa, Rome 1792, vol. I, pt. 2

Lucius III
College of Cardinals
12th-century Catholicism